Miller Municipal Airport  is a city-owned, public-use airport located two nautical miles (4 km) east of the central business district of Miller, a city in Hand County, South Dakota, United States. It is included in the National Plan of Integrated Airport Systems for 2011–2015, which categorized it as a general aviation facility.

Although many U.S. airports use the same three-letter location identifier for the FAA and IATA, this airport is assigned MKA by the FAA but has no designation from the IATA (which assigned MKA to Marianske Lazne Airport in Marianske Lazne, Czech Republic).

Facilities and aircraft 
Miller Municipal Airport covers an area of 252 acres (102 ha) at an elevation of 1,570 feet (479 m) above mean sea level. It has one runway designated 15/33 with an asphalt surface measuring 3,600 by 60 feet (1,097 x 18 m).

For the 12-month period ending April 19, 2012, the airport had 7,980 general aviation aircraft operations, an average of 21 per day. At that time there were 11 aircraft based at this airport: 91% single-engine and 9% multi-engine.

References

External links 
 Miller Airport (MKA) at SDDOT Airport Directory
 Aerial image as of June 1996 from USGS The National Map
 
 

Airports in South Dakota
Transportation in Hand County, South Dakota